Renin (etymology and pronunciation), also known as an angiotensinogenase, is an aspartic protease protein and enzyme secreted by the kidneys that participates in the body's renin–angiotensin–aldosterone system (RAAS)—also known as the renin–angiotensin–aldosterone axis—that increases the volume of extracellular fluid (blood plasma, lymph and interstitial fluid) and causes arterial vasoconstriction. Thus, it increases the body's mean arterial blood pressure.

Renin is not commonly referred to as a hormone, albeit it having a receptor, the (pro)renin receptor, also known as the renin receptor and prorenin receptor (see also below), as well as enzymatic activity with which it hydrolyzes angiotensinogen to angiotensin I.

Biochemistry and physiology

Structure
The primary structure of renin precursor consists of 406 amino acids with a pre- and a pro-segment carrying 20 and 46 amino acids, respectively. Mature renin contains 340 amino acids and has a mass of 37 kDa.

Secretion 
The enzyme renin is secreted by pericytes in the vicinity of the afferent arterioles and similar microvessels of the kidney from specialized cells of the juxtaglomerular apparatus—the juxtaglomerular cells, in response to three stimuli:
 A decrease in arterial blood pressure (that could be related to a decrease in blood volume) as detected by baroreceptors (pressure-sensitive cells). This is the most direct causal link between blood pressure and renin secretion (the other two methods operate via longer pathways).
 A decrease in sodium load delivered to the distal tubule. This load is measured by the macula densa of the juxtaglomerular apparatus.
 Sympathetic nervous system activity, which also controls blood pressure, acting through the β1 adrenergic receptors.

Human renin is secreted by at least 2 cellular pathways: a constitutive pathway for the secretion of the precursor prorenin and a regulated pathway for the secretion of mature renin.

Renin–angiotensin system

The renin enzyme circulates in the bloodstream and hydrolyzes (breaks down) angiotensinogen secreted from the liver into the peptide angiotensin I.

Angiotensin I is further cleaved in the lungs by endothelial-bound angiotensin-converting enzyme (ACE) into angiotensin II, the most vasoactive peptide. Angiotensin II is a potent constrictor of all blood vessels. It acts on the smooth muscle and, therefore, raises the resistance posed by these arteries to the heart. The heart, trying to overcome this increase in its 'load', works more vigorously, causing the blood pressure to rise. Angiotensin II also acts on the adrenal glands and releases aldosterone, which stimulates the epithelial cells in the distal tubule and collecting ducts of the kidneys to increase re-absorption of sodium, exchanging with potassium to maintain electrochemical neutrality, and water, leading to raised blood volume and raised blood pressure. The RAS also acts on the CNS to increase water intake by stimulating thirst, as well as conserving blood volume, by reducing urinary loss through the secretion of vasopressin from the posterior pituitary gland.

The normal concentration of renin in adult human plasma is 1.98–24.6 ng/L in the upright position.

Function 
Renin activates the renin–angiotensin system by using its endopeptidase activity to cleave  the peptide bonds between leucine and valine residues in angiotensinogen, produced by the liver, to yield angiotensin I, which is further converted into angiotensin II by ACE, the angiotensin–converting enzyme primarily within the capillaries of the lungs. Angiotensin II then constricts blood vessels, increases the secretion of ADH and aldosterone, and stimulates the hypothalamus to activate the thirst reflex, each leading to an increase in blood pressure. Renin's primary function is therefore to eventually cause an increase in blood pressure, leading to restoration of perfusion pressure in the kidneys.

Renin is secreted from juxtaglomerular kidney cells, which sense changes in renal perfusion pressure, via stretch receptors in the vascular walls. The juxtaglomerular cells are also stimulated to release renin by signaling from the macula densa. The macula densa senses changes in sodium delivery to the distal tubule, and responds to a drop in tubular sodium load by stimulating renin release in the juxtaglomerular cells. Together, the macula densa and juxtaglomerular cells comprise the juxtaglomerular complex.

Renin secretion is also stimulated by sympathetic nervous stimulation, mainly through β1 adrenoreceptor activation.

The (pro)renin receptor to which renin and prorenin bind is  encoded by the gene ATP6ap2, ATPase H(+)-transporting lysosomal accessory protein 2, which results in a fourfold increase in the conversion of angiotensinogen to angiotensin I over that shown by soluble renin as well as non-hydrolytic activation of prorenin via a conformational change in prorenin which exposes the catalytic site to angiotensinogen substrate. In addition, renin and prorenin binding results in phosphorylation of serine and tyrosine residues of ATP6AP2.

The level of renin mRNA appears to be modulated by the binding of HADHB, HuR and CP1 to a regulatory region in the 3' UTR.

Genetics 

The gene for renin, REN, spans 12 kb of DNA and contains 8 introns. It produces several mRNA that encode different REN isoforms.

Mutations in the REN gene can be inherited, and are a cause of a rare inherited kidney disease, so far found to be present in only 2 families. This disease is autosomal dominant, meaning that it is characterized by a 50% chance of inheritance and is a slowly progressive chronic kidney disease that leads to the need for dialysis or kidney transplantation.  Many—but not all—patients and families with this disease have an elevation in serum potassium and unexplained anemia relatively early in life.  Patients with a mutation in this gene can have a variable rate of loss of kidney function, with some individuals going on dialysis in their 40s while others may not go on dialysis until into their 70s.  This is a rare inherited kidney disease that exists in less than 1% of people with kidney disease.

Model organisms

Model organisms have been used in the study of REN function. A knockout mouse line, called Ren1Ren-1c Enhancer KO was generated. Male and female animals underwent a standardized phenotypic screen to determine the effects of deletion. Twenty four tests were carried out on mutant mice and two significant abnormalities were observed. Homozygous mutant animals had a decreased heart rate and an increased susceptibility to bacterial infection. A more detailed analysis of this line indicated plasma creatinine was also increased and males had lower mean arterial pressure than controls.

Clinical applications 

An over-active renin-angiotension system leads to vasoconstriction and retention of sodium and water. These effects lead to hypertension. Therefore, renin inhibitors can be used for the treatment of hypertension. This is measured by the plasma renin activity (PRA).

In current medical practice, the renin–angiotensin–aldosterone system's overactivity (and resultant hypertension) is more commonly reduced using either ACE inhibitors (such as ramipril and perindopril) or angiotensin II receptor blockers (ARBs, such as losartan, irbesartan or candesartan) rather than a direct oral renin inhibitor. ACE inhibitors or ARBs are also part of the standard treatment after a heart attack.

The differential diagnosis of kidney cancer in a young patient with hypertension includes juxtaglomerular cell tumor (reninoma), Wilms' tumor, and renal cell carcinoma, all of which may produce renin.

Measurement 

Renin is usually measured as the plasma renin activity (PRA). PRA is measured specially in case of certain diseases that present with hypertension or hypotension. PRA is also raised in certain tumors. A PRA measurement may be compared to a plasma aldosterone concentration (PAC) as a PAC/PRA ratio.

Discovery and naming
The name renin = ren + -in, "kidney" + "compound". Renin was discovered, characterized, and named in 1898 by Robert Tigerstedt, Professor of Physiology, and his student, Per Bergman, at the Karolinska Institute in Stockholm.

See also 
 Angiotensin-converting enzyme
 Plasma renin activity
 Renin inhibitor
 Renin stability regulatory element (REN-SRE)

References

Further reading

External links 
 The MEROPS online database for peptidases and their inhibitors: A01.007
 
 

EC 3.4.23
Hormones of the kidneys
Peptide hormones
Renal physiology
Genes mutated in mice